Sebastiano Arman (born 17 January 1997) is an Italian curler from Cembra. He competed at the 2015 Ford World Men's Curling Championship in Halifax, Nova Scotia, Canada, as alternate for the Italian team.

References

External links

Living people
1997 births
Sportspeople from Trento
Italian male curlers
Italian curling champions
Curlers at the 2022 Winter Olympics
Olympic curlers of Italy